Buel may refer to:

Places 

Buel, Kansas
Buel, Kentucky
Lake Buel, Massachusetts, United States
Buel Township, Michigan, United States

People 
Alexander W. Buel
David Hillhouse Buel (disambiguation)

See also
 Buell (disambiguation)
 Bühl (disambiguation)